Tanah Merah Airport  is one of the airports serving the Boven Digoel Regency, in the Indonesian province of South Papua. It is located in the regency's capital of Tanahmerah.

The airport served 2,200 passengers throughout 2016. It has serviced flights with the provincial capital at Jayapura (Sentani International Airport) and Merauke (Mopah International Airport) to the south. Both routes are serviced by Trigana Air.

The airport was briefly closed during the eruption of the Manam in Papua New Guinea in 2015.

Incidents
In 2008, a Pelita Air de Havilland Dash 7 was mired in the apron, although it was not damaged and was soon returned to service. An XpressAir Dornier 328 with 33 passengers ran off the side of the runway on 14 June 2009, with the aircraft substantially damaged although there were no casualties.

References

Airports in South Papua